Malgorzata Nowacka (born 1974) is a Canadian contemporary choreographer and dancer.

Life and career
Nowacka began her dance training at the School of Classical and Contemporary Dance directed by Bengt Jorgen in Toronto, Ontario.

Her first full-length choreographic work, Light Explorations of a Darker Nature was shown across Canada at the Canada Dance Festival and Dancing on the Edge. She is currently the Artistic Director of The Chimera Project, a Toronto-based contemporary dance company. She has been creating mainstage works for Ballet Jörgen Canada since 2000, which included Icarus and Seance.

References

External links
Malgorzata Nowacka artist's profile at The Chimera Project

1979 births
Living people
Canadian choreographers
Canadian women choreographers